María Esther Podestá (1896–1983) was an Argentine actress. She starred in the 1950 film Arroz con leche directed by Carlos Schlieper.

Selected filmography
Juan Moreira (1936)
Madame Bovary (1947)
El Muerto es un vivo (1953)

References

External links
 
 

Argentine film actresses
1896 births
1983 deaths
20th-century Argentine actresses